Miss May I is an American metalcore band from Troy, Ohio. Formed in 2007, they signed to Rise Records in 2008 and released their debut album, Apologies Are for the Weak through the label while the members were still attending high school. The album reached 76 on the Billboard 200, No. 29 on Billboards Top Heatseekers, and No. 66 on Top Independent Albums. The band has also had some of their material featured in big name productions; the song "Forgive and Forget" is featured on the Saw VI Original Motion Picture Soundtrack, and their song "Apologies Are for the Weak" is included in the video game Saints Row: The Third.

The band has retained the same lineup since its formation, with the only exception being bassist Ryan Neff, who left the band in 2007 and rejoined in 2009. Miss May I released their second studio album, Monument, on August 16, 2010; their third album, At Heart, on June 12, 2012; their fourth, Rise of the Lion, on April 29, 2014; their fifth, Deathless, on August 7, 2015. On June 24, 2016, the band left Rise Records and signed with SharpTone Records. On June 2, 2017, they released their sixth studio album, Shadows Inside, their first under their new label. On September 2, 2022, Miss May I released Curse of Existence.

History

Formation and early releases (2007–2013)
Miss May I was formed in 2007, in Troy, Ohio with the original members being Levi Benton, Justin Aufdemkampe, BJ Stead, Jerod Boyd, and Ryan Neff. Neff left in late 2007 to join Cincinnati band, Rose Funeral and was then replaced by Josh Gillespie.

In late 2007, the band released a five-track EP titled Vows for a Massacre followed by their 2008 demo the next year, both of which were self-released. This demo contained 6 tracks, including "Architect" and "Tides", which would later on be featured in their first full-length album, Apologies Are for the Weak in 2009. It was after this release, that the band was signed onto Rise Records.

According to the website of producer Joey Sturgis' Foundation Studios, the band had booked studio time in May 2010 to ostensibly record the follow-up to their debut album. According to Ryan Neff's Twitter, the new album would be released sometime in August along with a new music video.

On June 11, 2010, Levi Benton announced that there would be a track on the new album called "Colossal" and that the album would be called Monument and confirmed its release to be on August 17 of that year. The artwork for it was also later revealed, featuring the iconic MMI Lion from the cover of the band's debut. On September 2, 2010, they released their music video for "Relentless Chaos" Directed by Thunder Down Country. In December 2010, they confirmed plans to appear at Warped Tour 2011. The album peaked at 10 on the Top Hard Rock Albums chart, 15 on the Top Independent Albums chart, and 31 on the Top Rock Albums chart. The band toured with Abandon All Ships, Sleeping with Sirens and Bury Tomorrow to support the album.

The band appeared on the We Came as Romans Merchnow.com + Arkaik Clothing "I'm Alive" Tour (September - October 2011) with Close To Home, Of Mice & Men, and Texas in July. 
Following the "I'm Alive" Tour, the band co-headlined the 'No Guts No Glory' tour with Pierce the Veil, Woe, Is Me, and Letlive. The band also appeared on the 2011 Scream it Like you Mean it tour with We Came as Romans, The Word Alive and This or the Apocalypse.

On March 8, 2012, the band announced that they had completed work on their new album, At Heart, and were set to release the album on May 29, 2012. To make last-minute changes, the band bumped back the release, to June 12, 2012. They released "Hey Mister" on May 3 on Rise Record's YouTube page.

The band soon set out on tour with Whitechapel, After the Burial, The Plot in You, Rescued by a Sinking Ship, and Structures throughout March 2012, followed by a European tour with Parkway Drive, The Ghost Inside and Confession through April. The band also set out to tour with Whitechapel, The Ghost Inside, Within the Ruins and The Plot in You in the US during May 2012. The band played on Warped Tour in mid-2012. They supported Killswitch Engage for the United States Disarm the Descent tour in mid-2013 with others.

Recent work (2013–present) 

On December 14, 2013, the band announced that they are looking for a fan to get a tattoo of their infamous lion design for the cover of their forthcoming album. The band osted three studio updates on their new album-dedicated website, www.mmiriseofthelion.com, which briefly detail the drums, guitars, and vocals for the new album. On February 25, 2014, Rise of the Lion was announced as the title of the new album. The album was released on April 29, 2014.

In January 2015, they supported August Burns Red on the Frozen Flame Tour with Northlane, Fit for a King and ERRA.

The band recorded their fifth studio album with Joey Sturgis, who recorded the band's first two records. Deathless was released on August 7, 2015. The first single, "I.H.E.", was released on June 17, 2015. On July 29, 2015, the title track from Deathless was released as the second single for the album.

It was announced on June 24, 2016 that they had left Rise Records and signed with SharpTone Records.

The band performed a headline North American tour in support of their sixth album, Shadows Inside, in 2017. In 2018, they toured North America once again on the Gore Core Metal and More Tour, as support for Gwar and Hatebreed. In early 2019, the band supported August Burns Red on their Dangerous Tour. They played Monument in its entirety in mid-2019, they co-headlined the tour with The Word Alive.

On September 2, 2022, Miss May I released their seventh studio album, Curse of Existence.

Musical style and influences
Miss May I's musical style has been described as metalcore or melodic metalcore, mixing melodic death metal and thrash metal riffs with hardcore punk. Almost all of their recorded songs feature both unclean vocals, provided by the band's lead vocalist Levi Benton, and clean vocals, provided by their bassist Ryan Neff (and formerly Josh Gillespie), in similar fashion to many other melodic metalcore bands.

The band has stated their main influences are: Metallica, Pantera, Deftones, Unearth, White Zombie, Gojira, As Blood Runs Black, All Shall Perish, As I Lay Dying, Arch Enemy, Killswitch Engage, Lamb of God, Atreyu, Underoath, All That Remains, In Flames, Five Finger Death Punch, Avenged Sevenfold, The Black Dahlia Murder, Thirty Seconds to Mars, Darkest Hour, Bleeding Through, Trivium, Winter Solstice, Bring Me the Horizon, Anti-Flag, Parkway Drive, and It Dies Today.

In an interview with Guitar World, the band discussed how their influences have changed over the years. Guitarist Justin Aufdemkampe said he started by covering basic blues, then moved to pop punk by covering Blink-182, and Green Day, then eventually learned lead guitar by listening to and copying his dad's Stevie Ray Vaughan records. In the 10th grade, Justin started learning Taking Back Sunday, Underoath and Avenged Sevenfold songs. However, once he saw Atreyu at Warped Tour, his taste in music abruptly shifted. He then discovered As I Lay Dying, All That Remains and Darkest Hour, and began writing fast, aggressive originals.

According to bassist Ryan Neff, his influences are: Unearth, Deftones, Pantera, As I Lay Dying, Darkest Hour, Underoath, As Cities Burn, August Burns Red, the Bled, the Color Morale, Florence and the Machine, Marilyn Manson, A Perfect Circle, Nine Inch Nails, Oceana, Pierce the Veil, PMtoday, Saosin, and Tool. In an interview with Alternative Press, Ryan said his favorite band of all time is White Zombie.

Guitarist B.J. Stead stated "I had been playing guitar for years, but not much metal. I mostly listen to Pink Floyd and straight rock." In an interview with Alternative Press, it was said that B.J.'s favorite band is Iron Maiden.

The band has stated on their influences: 

In an interview with WIDB, Levi stated on behalf of his biggest musical influences: "As I Lay Dying is definitely the biggest one that really sets Miss May I where we are. We like a lot of All That Remains, Unearth, Darkest Hour and, recently, In Flames. This is weird, because it’s not really the thing that everyone would say, but we're really interested in Five Finger Death Punch. We’ve been researching how they do everything because their story’s really cool. But As I Lay Dying and All That Remains are probably the biggest ones, along with Killswitch Engage" Levi has stated his "dream tour" would be Lamb of God, As I Lay Dying, It Dies Today, and Atreyu.

In another interview, Levi Benton stated that he tries to make inspirational music rather than angry music. Through this, he uses his contemporary R&B influences such as Justin Timberlake, Jamie Foxx, and Usher. He also openly admits he listens to a lot of hip hop. His favorite artists are Dr. Dre, Yelawolf, Savage, Jay Z, and Eminem. The band has covered the song "Run This Town" by Jay Z featuring Kanye West and Rihanna for the Punk Goes Pop 3 album.

Religious views
In an interview with Dayton Daily News writer Madeline Bush, when asked what they thought their music conveyed, Benton replied:

Members 

Current
 Levi Benton – unclean vocals (2006–present)
 B.J. Stead – lead guitar (2006–present); backing vocals (2014–present)
 Justin Aufdemkampe – rhythm guitar (2006–present); backing vocals (2014–present)
 Jerod Boyd – drums, percussion (2006–present)
 Ryan Neff – bass, clean vocals (2006–2007, 2009–present)

Former
 Josh Gillespie – bass, clean vocals (2007–2009)

Touring
 Elisha Mullins – lead guitar (2022–present)

Discography
Albums

Other releases
Vows for a Massacre (self-released EP; 2007)
Demo 2008 (self-released demo; 2008)

Music videos

Collaborations

References

External links
 

2006 establishments in Ohio
Metalcore musical groups from Ohio
Musical quintets
Musical groups established in 2006
Rise Records artists